Zygocarpum caeruleum is a species of flowering plant in the family Fabaceae. It is found only in Yemen. Its natural habitats are subtropical or tropical dry forests and subtropical or tropical dry shrubland.

Habitat
Common in semi-deciduous woodland and shrubland, mainly on the limestone plateaus but also occurs on granite in the Haggeher mountains (Socotra Island). Altitude of (50–)200–800 m.

Recognized by the violet-blue flowers. Usually a slender tree or shrub but can be prostrate in windswept places on the limestone plateau. However, it is easily recognized, even when not in flower, by the distinctive purplish black line along the midrib on the undersurface of the leaflets.

References

Dalbergieae
Endemic flora of Socotra
Least concern plants
Least concern biota of Asia
Taxa named by Isaac Bayley Balfour
Taxonomy articles created by Polbot